The London Screenwriters' Festival is an annual writers' and film makers' festival held in London, England since 2010. The festival offers workshops, seminars, lectures, screenplay competitions and the opportunity to pitch projects to a number of agencies, Film and Television Producers and Studios from both the United Kingdom and Hollywood.

History

The London Screenwriters’ Festival was launched in 2010 by Chris Jones, filmmaker and author of The Guerilla Filmmakers Handbook. The event is held over the last weekend of October every year, attracting around 150 speakers and 600 delegates. Since its launch in 2010 it has been held at Regent's University London.

The festival is owned and operated by London Creative Festivals Ltd whose offices are at Ealing Studios in West London.

Pitching has always played a big part of the Screenwriters’ Festival, and in
2012, the founders of The Great American Pitchfest (Bob Schultz and Sign
Olynyk) worked with the London Screenwriters' Festival to create the Great British Pitchfest.

Speakers

The Speakers of 2010 included over 80 speakers from a wide array of professions including David Hare, Joe Eszterhas and Nick Hornby, along with other producers, writers, agent, executives, educators and directors.

Competitions

2010 Green Light Award

Winner - Laurence Timms for his script The Dead Office
2nd Place - Henry Fosdike for his script The Decision
3rd Place - Charlie Boddington for his script It's Not Easy

2010 'Inspired by Science' Treatment Award 

Winner - Rachel Matthews

2011 'Four Nights In August'
Winner- Dave Turner with Everything You Need
Winner- Milethia Thomas with Why
Winner- Anil Rao with Why

2012 '50 Kisses'

Winner- Kristy McConnell with Enough

British Screenwriters’ Awards 
The British Screenwriters’ Awards were launched in 2014.

References

External links
London Screenwriters' Festival
Guerilla Film Makers Masterclass
Living Spirit Pictures

Film festivals in London